Croatia participated in the Eurovision Song Contest 2003 with the song "Više nisam tvoja" written by Andrej Babić. The song was performed by Claudia Beni. The Croatian broadcaster Croatian Radiotelevision (HRT) organised the national final Dora 2003 to select the Croatian entry for the 2003 contest in Riga, Latvia. Twenty-four entries competed in the national final which consisted of three shows: two semi-finals and a final. Six entries qualified from each semi-final on 7 and 8 March 2003 to compete in the final on 9 March 2003. In the final, "Više nisam tvoja" performed by Claudia Beni was selected as the winner following a regional televote.

Croatia competed in the Eurovision Song Contest which took place on 24 May 2003. Performing during the show in position 8, Croatia placed fifteenth out of the 26 participating countries, scoring 29 points.

Background 

The nation's best result in the contest was fourth, which it achieved on two occasions: in 1996 with the song "Sveta ljubav" performed by Maja Blagdan and in 1999 with the song "Marija Magdalena" performed by Doris Dragović. In 2002, Croatia placed eleventh with Vesna Pisarović and the song "Everything I Want".

The Croatian national broadcaster, Croatian Radiotelevision (HRT), broadcasts the event within Croatia and organises the selection process for the nation's entry. Since 1993, HRT organised the national final Dora in order to select the Croatian entry for the Eurovision Song Contest, a method that was continued for their 2003 participation.

Before Eurovision

Dora 2003 
Dora 2003 was the eleventh edition of the Croatian national selection Dora which selected Croatia's entry for the Eurovision Song Contest 2003. The competition consisted of two semi-finals on 7 and 8 March 2003 and a final on 9 March 2003, all taking place at the Hotel Kvarner in Opatija and broadcast on HTV1 as well as online via the broadcaster's website hrt.hr.

Format 
Twenty-four songs competed in Dora 2003 which consisted of three shows: two semi-finals and a final. Twelve songs competed in each semi-final with the top six proceeding to complete the twelve-song lineup in the final. The results of all shows were determined solely by public televoting, and the votes were divided into five telephone regions in Croatia, each of them which created an overall ranking from which points from 1 (lowest) to 12 (highest) were assigned to the competing songs. Ties in all shows were decided in favour of the entry that received the higher number of high-scoring points.

Competing entries 
On 15 December 2002, HRT opened a submission period where artists and composers were able to submit their entries to the broadcaster with the deadline on 20 January 2003. 270 entries were received by the broadcaster during the submission period. A fifteen-member expert committee consisting of representatives of Damir Matković (HRT), Aleksandar Kostadinov (HRT), Željko Mesar (HRT), Miroslav Škoro (HDU), Stjepan Mihaljinec (HDS), Siniša Doronjga (HGU), Đorđe Novković (Croatia Records), Fedor Boić (Tonika), Boris Horvat (Aquarius Records), Silvije Varga (Dancing Bear), Siniša Bizović (Dallas Records), Branko Komljenović (Menart), Tihomir Preradović (Tutico), Željko Barba (Orfej) and Goran Karan (Skalinada) reviewed the received submissions and selected twenty-four artists and songs for the competition. HRT announced the competing entries on 30 January 2003 and among the artists were Maja Blagdan who represented Croatia in the Eurovision Song Contest 1996 and Emilija Kokić who won the Eurovision Song Contest 1989 for Yugoslavia as a member of Riva.

Shows

Semi-finals 
The two semi-finals took place on 7 and 8 March 2003. The first semi-final was hosted by Ljiljana Vinković and Mirko Fodor, while the second semi-final was hosted by Karmela Vukov-Colić and Davor Meštrović. The six qualifiers for the final from each semi-final were determined by a regional televote. In addition to the performances of the competing entries, 2001 Croatian Eurovision entrant Vanna performed as the interval act during the first semi-final, while 2000 Croatian Eurovision entrant Goran Karan performed as the interval act during the second semi-final.

Final
The final took place on 9 March 2003, hosted by Duško Ćurlić and Danijela Trbović-Vlajki. The winner, "Više nisam tvoja" performed by Claudia Beni, was determined by a regional televote. In addition to the performances of the competing entries, Divas performed with Gabi Novak, Josipa Lisac, Meri Cetinić and Radojka Šverko as the interval act during the show.

Preparation 
An English version of "Više nisam tvoja" entitled "This Is for Real" was presented to the public on 16 March during a special programme broadcast on HTV1 and HR 2. The language of the song Claudia Beni would perform at the Eurovision Song Contest was determined exclusively by a public televote, and the Croatian version was selected with 10,926 votes while the English version received 5,678 votes. On 21 March, HRT announced that "Više nisam tvoja" would be performed in a bilingual mix of both Croatian and English at the contest.

At Eurovision
According to Eurovision rules, all nations with the exceptions of the bottom ten countries in the 2002 contest competed in the final on 24 May 2003. On 29 November 2002, a special allocation draw was held which determined the running order and Croatia was set to perform in position 8, following the entry from Portugal and before the entry from Cyprus. Croatia finished in sixth place with 29 points.

The show was broadcast in Croatia on HRT. The Croatian spokesperson, who announced the Croatian votes during the final, was Davor Meštrović.

Voting
Below is a breakdown of points awarded to Croatia and awarded by Croatia in the contest. The nation awarded its 12 points to Russia in the contest.

References

External links
 Dora 2003 at the HRT website 
 Dora 2003 at the Eurofest Croatia website 

2003
Countries in the Eurovision Song Contest 2003
Eurovision